Marston's plc is a British pub and hotel operator. Founded by John Marston in 1834, it is listed on the London Stock Exchange. Marston's disposed of its brewing operations in 2020, selling the assets to a newly formed joint venture with the Carlsberg Group to create the Carlsberg Marston's Brewing Company (CMBC), in which Marston's plc holds a 40% share.

History
In 1834, John Marston established J. Marston & Son at the Horninglow Brewery in Burton upon Trent. By 1861, the brewery produced 3,000 barrels a year. In 1890, Marston & Son Ltd was registered as a limited liability company. In 1898 Marston's amalgamated with John Thompson & Son Ltd and moved to Albion Brewery on Shobnall Road, which the company still operates. By this time the brewery had a capacity of 100,000 barrels a year. It was at this time that the Burton Union System began to be used. In 1905, the company merged with Sydney Evershed to form Marston, Thompson & Evershed.

Banks & Co has been brewing at the Park Brewery in Wolverhampton since 1875. In 1890 Banks became Wolverhampton & Dudley Breweries when the company amalgamated with George Thompson & Sons and Charles Colonel Smith's Brewery. In 1943 Wolverhampton & Dudley Breweries took over Julia Hanson & Sons, with 200 pubs. It was first listed on the London Stock Exchange in 1947. It acquired Camerons Brewery in Hartlepool in 1992 and sold it to Castle Eden in 2002, whilst retaining some of Cameron's tied pubs.

In 1999, Wolverhampton & Dudley Breweries purchased Marston, Thompson & Evershed, and in the same year took over the Mansfield Brewery of Nottinghamshire and closed it down, transferring production of Mansfield beers to the Park Brewery. In 2005, Marston's Brewery took over production under licence from Interbrew of Draught Bass, succeeding Coors. Later in 2005, the Jennings Brewery of Cockermouth was purchased and in 2007 Hampshire-based Ringwood Brewery, which was established in 1978, and brews Best Bitter, Fortyniner, and Old Thumper, was acquired. In 2007, the company changed its name from Wolverhampton & Dudley Breweries plc to Marston's plc.

In late 2013, there was some controversy when it was announced that Marston's would sell some 200 pubs to new company New River Retail. The fear was that many would close and be turned into convenience stores. In 2014, the company took over production of most Thwaites beers after the closure of the latter's main brewery. On 31 March 2015, it was announced the company was buying the bulk of Thwaites beer supply business outright and the top two brands Wainwright and Lancaster Bomber for around £25m.
In May 2017, Marston's announced further expansion with the acquisition of Charles Wells's Eagle Brewery in Bedford. This gave Marston's ownership of the Bombardier, Courage and McEwan's ale brands, and the global licence for Young's beers.

In February 2020, Marston's signed a five-year extension to its distribution deal with Japanese beer maker Kirin.

In May 2020, it was announced that subject to competition law and shareholder approval, Marston's would merge its brewing business with Carlsberg UK (the United Kingdom arm of Carlsberg Group), into a joint venture valued at £780m. Marston's will take a 40% stake in the joint venture and receive up to £273m in cash. The deal will involve Marston's six breweries and distribution depots, but not its 1,400 pubs. The merger was approved by the Competition and Markets Authority on 9 October 2020. The new brewing company will be headquartered in Wolverhampton and be known as Carlsberg Marston's Brewing Company. It was also announced that the transaction was expected to be completed by the end of October 2020. The same month, the company announced that it will cut over 2,150 jobs (a fifth of their employees) as a result of the strict UK government measures to fight the spread of the COVID-19 pandemic. In December 2020, Marston's took over the running of 156 pubs in Wales from Welsh brewer Brains.

Operations

The company owns and operates six breweries (as of July 2020):

 The Park Brewery in Wolverhampton brews Banks's and Mansfield beers plus most Thwaites beers under contract.
 The Marston's Brewery in Burton upon Trent brews Marston's and Bass plus Tetley's beers under contract.
 The Jennings Brewery in Cockermouth
 The Wychwood Brewery in Witney (which includes the Brakspear Brewhouse)
 The Ringwood Brewery in Ringwood, Hampshire
 The Eagle Brewery, (formerly Charles Wells) Bedford brews Bombardier, Courage, Waggle Dance, the global Young's licence and Scottish brands McEwan's and William Younger

The company operates over 1,700 pubs and bars across England and Wales, around 300 tenanted and 500 leased and a hotel chain.

Brewing methods
Marston's is the only remaining brewer to use Burton Union Sets, a system whereby fermentation barrels and troughs are linked together by pipework. The basic principle is one of preventing excessive beer and yeast loss through foaming, but the consequence is that the beer is in contact with more wood and with more beer, fermenting in a bigger volume, typically totalling about 100 barrels or 160 hectolitres. That results in a more consistent flavour and very little chance of a whole batch being ruined. All other large-scale brewers have abandoned that method in favour of stainless steel fermenting vessels, which while they ensure (through volume) a consistent flavour, limit the use of traditional yeast varieties. They make selective use of the unusual double dropping process (for example, in the production of Brakspear Bitter), which introduces complex flavours by a period of accelerated yeast growth.

Beers

The main beers are Mansfield, Wainwright, Marston's Pedigree and EPA, McEwans Export, McEwan's Special, Bombardier, Wychwood Hobgoblin, Jennings Cumberland Ale, and Banks's Bitter and Mild. Despite a general UK-wide decline in the popularity of mild ales, Banks's Mild still outsells its stablemate bitter in the West Midlands market and is the best-selling mild ale in the world. The company also owns Sunbeam, a blonde beer which is brewed and distributed from the Banks's brewery based in Wolverhampton. Sunbeam was first produced in 2011, to commemorate the 10th anniversary of Wolverhampton achieving city status.

Half of all its beer is bottled. Marston's brews Draught Bass for AB InBev and Tetley Bitter, Mild and Dark Mild for Carlsberg. Marston's Pedigree is a 4.3% ABV bitter. Introduced in 1952, it is Marston's flagship brand, selling 150,000 hectolitres in 2010. It is the only beer to use the oak Burton Union System so that it is fermented in wood; the ingredients are mineral enriched Burton Water, malted barley, and Fuggles and Goldings hops.

Wainwright is one of the company's best-selling beers and is brewed at the Banks's Brewery in Wolverhampton. It is a 4.1% ABV golden ale named in honour of the famous fell walker and author Alfred Wainwright. Marston's acquired the brand from Thwaites in 2015. In 2016, the Thwaites branding was dropped and the beer was rebranded "The golden beer".

The acquisition of Charles Wells's Eagle Brewery in Bedford increased Marston's share of the British ale market. It also widened its geographical reach giving it southern English brands Bombardier, Waggledance, Courage, the global Young's licence and Scottish brands McEwan's and William Younger.

Sponsorship
From 2007 to 2017, Marston's had a sponsorshop agreement with the England and Wales Cricket Board, whereby Marston's Pedigree was the official beer of the England Cricket team. Marston's was the official supplier of beer at all home test matches and had exclusive beer advertising rights.

See also
 Brewers of Burton
 British regional breweries using wooden casks

References

External links
 Marston's PLC
 Marston's Inns

Breweries in England
Companies based in Wolverhampton
British companies established in 1834
Food and drink companies established in 1890
Companies listed on the London Stock Exchange
Food and drink companies established in 1834